A transfer line is a manufacturing system which consists of a predetermined sequence of machines connected by an automated material handling system and designed for working on a very small family of parts. Parts can be moved singularly because there’s no need for batching when carrying parts between process stations (as opposed to a job shop for example). The line can synchronous, meaning that all parts advance with the same speed, or asynchronous, meaning buffers exist between stations where parts wait to be processed. Not all transfer lines must geometrically be straight lines, for example circular solutions have been developed which make use of rotary tables, however using buffers becomes almost impossible.

A crucial problem for this production system is that of line balancing: a trade-off between increasing productivity and minimizing cost conserving total processing time.

Advantages
Easy management: low work in progress and scheduling without simultaneous processing of different products
Low need for manpower
Less space needed (compare with job shop)
Less output variability: no alternative technological cycles and quality control is more effective (less WIP and easier to automate) 
High system saturation: less production mix variability
Fast lead time.
High volume of production is possible.

Disadvantages
Very low flexibility
Risk of obsolescence: due to new product introduction
High vulnerability to failures: a failure in a single machine blocks the whole system in very short time

See also
Job shop
Production line
Workflow

External links
 Fuel injector transfer line with poka-yoke
 Brush transfer line
 Load/Unload Station of a golf ball transfer line

Manufacturing